The Portuguese Basketball All-Star Day (Portuguese: Dia das Estrelas) is an annual basketball event in Portugal, which has been organised by the Portuguese Basketball Federation since 2008. It was originally founded by the Portuguese Basketball League (LCB) in 1990 and it was run for 18 editions, formerly known as All-Star Game (Portuguese: Jogo das Estrellas). The PBF took over after the LCB ceased operations in 2008. The All-Star Game includes a match between the South and North selection, a slam-dunk and a three-point contest. The starting five of each selection is chosen by online voting by fans and the remainder is decided by coaches following the NBA pattern.

History
,The first edition of the All-Star Game took place in 1990-91 season, in the Azorean island of Horta in 17 November 1990. It was organised by the now defunct League of Professional Clubs (LCB) and it featured players like Carlos Lisboa, Mike Plowden, Pedro Miguel Neves, Jean-Jacques Conceição and others. It would go on for 18 seasons until 2008 when LCB was dissolved. In the 2008-09 season the Portuguese Basketball Federation (FPB) took the responsibility of 
organising the event choosing the town of Moimenta da Beira as the host of the first All-Star Game under its auspices. For the following season the town of Guarda was next to host the event which went in hiatus right after and for 6 years. In 2016 the PFB revived the historical event integrating it into the 12th Albufeira Youth Basketball Festival (YBF), the largest national youth sports event of Portugal.

List of games

Organised by LCB 1990-2008
Bold: Team that won the game.

Organised by PBF 2009-present
Bold: Team that won the game.

Three-Point Shoot Contest

Slam-Dunk Contest

Adidas Two-Ball contest

External links
https://www.fpb.pt/noticia/dia-das-estrelas/

References

Basketball all-star games
Basketball in Portugal